Jaime Miguel Córdoba Taborda (born 7 May 1988) is a Colombian footballer who plays as a midfielder for Cortulua. He previously played for América de Cali, Junior Barranquilla and more recently Atlético Nacional.

Córdoba came to fame after winning a starting spot on America de Cali at 20 and helping them win their 13th league title. His performances lead for FIFA to name him one of the best young players for 2009.

External links
Ones to watch 2009 at fifa.com

Living people
1988 births
Colombian footballers
América de Cali footballers
Atlético Junior footballers
Atlético Nacional footballers
Categoría Primera A players
Association football midfielders
Footballers from Cali